The Sebastopol Football Netball Club, nicknamed the Burras, is an Australian rules football and netball club based in the southern suburb of Sebastopol in Victoria. The football team currently competes in the Ballarat Football Netball League, having debuted there in 1978.

History
The club was originally founded in 1893, and completed in the Ballarat Football Association wearing the colours of red and white before changing to blue and white in 1894. The club was a founding member of the competition in 1893 finishing in fourth place, and took until 1920 to win its inaugural premiership. In 1922 the club adopted the colours of blue and gold that prevail to the present day.

After winning its second premiership in 1929, Sebastopol moved to the Ballarat and District Football League and won two premierships in a row in 1936 and 1937 before joining the Ballarat Football League in 1938. The club played off in the grand final in its first season and were defeated by South Ballarat, but then in 1939 it transferred to the Clunes Football Association winning the premiership before returning to the BFL in 1940. Consequent to this World War Two affected player numbers causing Sebastopol to form a temporary merger with South Ballarat before the BFL went into recess.

Sebastopol returned in its pre war form in 1946 rejoining the Clunes FA. In 1947 it moved back to the BFL in its B Grade competition, and won premierships from 1950 to 1953. In 1959 the B Grade competition separated from the BFL to form the Ballarat District Football League and Sebastopol won premierships in this competition in 1965, 1967 and 1969. The BDFL then merged in 1973 with the Bacchus Marsh Football League and Sebastopol won the premiership in this competition in 1975. This would be the club's last premiership to date.

Sebastopol rejoined the BFL in 1978 and has made four grand finals, losing them to North Ballarat in 1985, Melton Football Club in 2000 and 2022, and East Point Football Club in 2019.

Following a succuesful 2022, the Club announced the departure of Senior Coach Michael Searle - citing work commitments. In late 2022, Sebastopol then announced both Luke Kiel and Michael Columbro as 2023 Senior coaches.

Netball
Sebastopol won the 1993 Ballarat Football League Netball Premiership, led by club-icon Maree Hutt. 

On October 26, 2012, Sebastopol announced the signing of Central Highlands Football League club Dunnstown's premiership coach Georgia Cann.  

Club-coach Cann was joined by Narelle Perkins to co-coach the club in 2022.

The 2022 season was Ballarat Football League Netball's first full season since 2019, due to COVID-19 interruptions in 2020 and 2021. The Burras returned to court against Darley Football Club to go down 42-38 at Marty Busch Oval on 9 April 2022. After a string of narrow losses, Sebastopol stunned the competition by drawing with then-competition leaders Melton South Football Club 50-all. Their first win of the season came in an emphatic 63-42 victory over Ballarat Football Club. The Burras finished seventh with four wins, missing finals. The Best and Fairest was won by Adut Manyiel with young gun Libby Hutt finishing second. Thalia Watts secured the Coaches Award.
Adut Manyiel was part of the Victorian Netball League Under 19s Grand Final win with City West Falcons, starring in the shooting circle.  

On September 22, 2022, the Burra announced that Perkins would become Head Coach from 2023.

Home ground

Sebastopol play their home matches at Marty Busch Reserve, Sebastopol.

In the 2019 offseason, Sebastopol secured a major sponsorship deal with Sovereign Financial Group. The home ground will be played under the banner of the Sovereign Financial Group Oval for seasons 2020 and 2021.

Club song
Out we come, 

Out we come,

Out we come to play

Just for recreation sake

To pass the time away

Lots of fun, lots of fun

Enjoy yourself today

The Burra boys are on the ball

When they come out to play!

Soooo, Join in the chorus

And sing it one and all

Join in the chorus

The Burras on the ball

Good old Burra

They're champions you'll agree

The Burra boys are premiers

Just you wait & see!!

VFL/AFL/AFLW/VNL/Super Netball players
 Daryl Peoples - 
 Wayne Johnston - 
 Malcolm Scott (Australian footballer) -  and 
 Mick McGuane -  and 
 Steven Venner - 
 Matt Austin - 
 Brett Goodes - 
 Rowan Marshall- 
 Kaitlyn Ashmore -  and 
 Nicole Hildebrand -  and 
 Adut Manyiel - Victoria Netball League City West Falcons

Bibliography
 History of Football in the Ballarat District  by John Stoward -

References

External links
 Official website

Ballarat Football League clubs
1879 establishments in Australia
Sports clubs established in 1879
Australian rules football clubs established in 1879
Netball teams in Victoria (Australia)
Australian rules football clubs in Victoria (Australia)